John Andrew Howard Ogdon (27 January 1937 – 1 August 1989) was an English pianist and composer.

Biography

Career
Ogdon was born in Mansfield Woodhouse, Nottinghamshire, and attended the Manchester Grammar School, before studying at the Royal Northern College of Music (formerly The Royal Manchester College of Music) between 1953 and 1957, where his fellow students under Richard Hall included Harrison Birtwistle, Alexander Goehr, Elgar Howarth and Peter Maxwell Davies. Together they formed New Music Manchester, a group dedicated to the performances of serial and other modern works. His tutor there was Claud Biggs. As a boy he had studied with Iso Elinson and after leaving college, he further studied with Gordon Green, Denis Matthews, Dame Myra Hess, and Egon Petri—the last in Basel, Switzerland.

He won first prize at the London Liszt Competition in 1961 and consolidated his growing international reputation by winning another first prize at the International Tchaikovsky Competition in Moscow in 1962, jointly with Vladimir Ashkenazy.

Ogdon was able to play most pieces at sight and had committed a huge range of pieces to memory. He intended to record the complete piano works of Sergei Rachmaninoff, a feat which would constitute about six full-length CDs, but only recorded about half of them. The recordings were released in 2001. He recorded all ten Scriabin sonatas in 1971. Ogdon was also a formidable exponent of the works of Alkan and Busoni. In more familiar repertoire, he revealed deep musical sensibilities, always buttressed by a colossal technique.  He also recorded a number of duo-piano works with his wife, Brenda Lucas, also known as Brenda Lucas Ogdon.

On 2 February 1969, on British television, he gave the first modern performance of Edward Elgar's Concert Allegro, Op. 46. The piece was never published and the manuscript had long been believed lost, but it came to light in 1968. Ogdon and Diana McVeigh developed a performing version of the piece from Elgar's manuscript, which was full of corrections, deletions and additions. Between 1976 and 1980 Ogdon was Professor of Music (Piano) at Indiana University. He completed four comprehensive tours of Southern Africa to enthusiastic acclaim between 1968 and 1976 and dedicated a composition to his tour organizer Hans Adler.

His own compositions number more than 200, and include four operas, two large works for orchestra, three cantatas, songs, chamber music, a substantial amount of music for solo piano, and two piano concertos, the first of which he recorded. The majority of his music was composed for the piano. These include 50 transcriptions of works by composers as diverse as Stravinsky, Palestrina, Mozart, Satie and Wagner. He also made piano arrangements of songs by Cole Porter, Jerome Kern and George Gershwin and he wrote unaccompanied sonatas for violin, flute and cello. A planned symphony based on the works of Herman Melville, and a comic opera were left unfinished. The original manuscripts of many of Ogdon's compositions are deposited in the Royal Northern College of Music Library.

Breakdown
Ogdon's health was good, and his physical constitution was strong, as his wife often recalled in her biography. Regarded as a "gentle giant", known and loved for his kindness and generosity, he had tremendous energy. But an everyday business argument seemed to upset him more than expected and then suddenly in 1973 he experienced a severe breakdown. This sometimes changed his personality completely. His illness was initially diagnosed as schizophrenia, but then changed to manic depression (now referred to as bipolar disorder). Either condition may have been inherited from his father, who suffered several psychotic episodes and a mental breakdown. Ogdon spent some time in the Maudsley Hospital in London, and in general needed more nursing than it was possible to provide while touring. Nevertheless, he was reported to maintain three hours' practice a day on the hospital's piano.

In 1983, after emerging from hospital, he played at the opening of the Royal Concert Hall in Nottingham. In 1988 he released a five-disc recording of an interpretation of Sorabji's Opus clavicembalisticum.  He died in August 1989 of pneumonia, brought on by undiagnosed diabetes.

Legacy
His wife Brenda, along with writer Michael Kerr, wrote a biography of her life with him in 1981, and released a second edition in 1989, shortly before his death. Another biography by Charles Beauclerk was published in March 2014.

In the BBC film about his life, Virtuoso, based on the biography, Ogdon was played by Alfred Molina, who won a Best Actor award from the Royal Television Society for the performance. The production interpreted Ogdon's illness as manic depression rather than schizophrenia, since he had responded much better to treatment for the former condition. Brenda Ogdon also recalled being informed that his obsessive musical work could have been interpreted as a symptom of manic depression.

In June 2014 the hour-long documentary, directed by Zoe Dobson, entitled John Ogdon: Living with Genius, was broadcast on BBC Four, with Ogdon's wife Brenda and her children Richard and Annabel telling his personal story for the first time. The programme featured unique archive and contemporary performance. The programme was followed by John Ogdon: A Musical Tribute featuring piano performances by Peter Donohoe, including Ogdon's own Theme and Variations.

In 1990, Gordon Rumson, another devoted advocate for Sorabji's music, composed the piano piece Threnody for John Ogdon.  Organist Kevin Bowyer commissioned and premiered Alistair Hinton's organ work Pansophiae for John Ogdon (Hinton is the curator of the Sorabji Archive and worked with Ogdon on the recording of Sorabji's Opus clavicembalisticum).

Ogdon is survived by his daughter and son, Annabel and Richard Ogdon.

Discography

A reasonably comprehensive discography can be found on the website of the John Ogdon Foundation reproduced from The Gramophone Spring 1998 edition as compiled by Michael Glover. However, a small number of other recordings have since come to light:

 Ludwig van Beethoven
 Piano Sonata No. 32 in C minor, Op. 111
 Recorded in the BBC studios, London, 5 November 1963
 Concerto for Piano and Orchestra No. 5 in E major, Op. 73
 Recorded with the BBC Northern Symphony Orchestra and Jascha Horenstein
 32 Variations on an original theme in C minor, WoO 80
 Sir Arthur Bliss
 Piano Concerto in B-flat, BBC Symphony Orchestra under the composer, 2 August 1966, Bliss birthday concert
 Johannes Brahms
 Concerto for Piano and Orchestra No. 2 in B major, Op. 83
 Recorded in the BBC Studios, Manchester, 16 September 1966 with the Hallé Orchestra and John Barbirolli
 Percy Grainger
 Transcription of Lullaby from Tribute to Foster
 Recorded at the 1966 Aldeburgh Festival
 Shepherd's Hey
 Recorded at the 1966 Aldeburgh Festival
 Zanzibar Boat Song
 Recorded at the 1966 Aldeburgh Festival with Benjamin Britten and Viola Tunnard
 Alun Hoddinott
 Sonata No. 3, Op. 40
 Recorded at the 23rd Cheltenham Festival
 Franz Liszt
 Concerto for Piano and Orchestra No. 1 in E major, S.124
 Recorded in the Colston Hall, Bristol, 20 September 1967
 Mephisto Waltz No. 1 (Der Tanz in der Dorfschenke), S.514
 Recorded in the Queen Elizabeth Hall, London, 24 April 1969
 Grande Fantaisie de bravoure sur La Clochette (La campanella) de Paganini, S.420
 Recorded in the BBC studios, London, 20 January 1970
 Grande Etude S.137, No.11 (1837 version of Etude d'exécution transcendente S.139, No. 11 Harmonies du soir)
 Recorded in the BBC studios, London, 20 January 1970
 Tilo Medek
 "Battaglia alla Turca" for two pianos, from Mozart's Rondo alla Turca
 Recorded live in London in 1974 with John Lill
 Nikolai Medtner
 Piano Sonata in C minor, Op. 25, No.1 (Fairy Tale)
 Recorded in 1971 for the BBC
 Piano Sonata in E minor, Op. 25, No.2 (Night Wind)
 Recorded in 1972?
 Franz Schubert
 Piano Sonata in C minor, D.958
 Recorded in 1972 for the BBC
 Dmitri Shostakovich
 Piano Sonata No. 2 in B minor, Op. 61
 Recorded in 1971 for the BBC
 Igor Stravinsky
 Sonata for two pianos (1943/1944)
 Recorded at the 23rd Cheltenham Festival with Brenda Lucas
 Concerto for two solo pianos (1935)
 Recorded at the 23rd Cheltenham Festival with Brenda Lucas

Recordings
 Ferruccio Busoni: Fantasia contrappuntistica, Fantasia nach J. S. Bach, and Toccata. Altarus AIR-CD-9074
 Ferruccio Busoni: Piano Concerto (with the Royal Philharmonic Orchestra; Daniell Revenaugh, conductor). EMI Classics 94637246726
 Kaikhosru Sorabji: Opus clavicembalisticum. Altarus AIR-CD9075

References

External links
John Ogdon on BBC Desert Island Discs
The John Ogdon Foundation
[ allmusic.com biography]
Virtuoso biographical programme on Ogdon's life on IMDb
 Portrait of John Ogdon at the Piano (aquatint by George Adamson RE published on the record sleeve of William Alwyn: Fantasy – Waltzes, 12 Preludes played by John Ogdon)

English classical pianists
Male classical pianists
1937 births
1989 deaths
Musicians from Nottinghamshire
People from Mansfield Woodhouse
People educated at Manchester Grammar School
People with bipolar disorder
Pupils of Egon Petri
Alumni of the Royal Northern College of Music
Prize-winners of the International Tchaikovsky Competition
20th-century classical pianists
20th-century English musicians
Deaths from pneumonia in England
English male classical composers
English classical composers
20th-century classical composers
20th-century British composers
British male pianists
20th-century British male musicians